The Hotel Fort Des Moines is an historic building located in downtown Des Moines, Iowa, United States.  It was listed on the National Register of Historic Places in 1982.

History
The three original promoters of the hotel were Des Moines businessmen Richard R. Rollins, Frederick C. Hubbell, Clyde Herring, and Norman M. Wilchinski.  The prominent Des Moines architectural firm of Proudfoot, Bird & Rawson designed the building, which opened in 1919.  Twelve United States presidents, including Woodrow Wilson, Harry S. Truman, John F. Kennedy, Richard Nixon and George H. W. Bush were guests in the hotel.  Other notable guests have included actress Mae West, aviator Charles Lindbergh and Soviet premier Nikita Khrushchev.  Singer Tiny Tim lived at the hotel for several years in the early 1990s.  The hotel closed to guests on November 13, 2015 for ongoing renovations, following the sale of the property from Jeff Hunter to Hawkeye Hotels, and will reopen as a Curio Collection Hilton Worldwide hotel.

Architecture
There are two floors below ground and the building contains three elevators. The hotel rooms are in a nine-story H-shaped tower that allows for increased light and air circulation for more rooms. It sits on a two-story base that houses the public rooms and commercial space. The exterior of the building can be divided into three sections visually using the principle of the classical column: a solid base, a basically unadorned shaft, and a decorative capital. The ornamentation is concentrated on the lower floors and near the top just below the cornice line.

References

External links

Hotel Fort Des Moines Website

Hotel buildings completed in 1919
Buildings and structures in Des Moines, Iowa
National Register of Historic Places in Des Moines, Iowa
Hotel buildings on the National Register of Historic Places in Iowa
Hotels in Iowa